Traditionally, the Taiwanese indigenous peoples are usually classified into two groups by their places of residence. Languages and cultures of aboriginal tribes were recorded by the government of Dutch Formosa, Spanish Formosa and the Qing Empire.

Research on ethnic groups of Taiwanese indigenous peoples started in late 19th century, when Taiwan was under Japanese rule. The  conducted large amount of research and further distinguished the ethnic groups of Taiwanese indigenous peoples by linguistics (see Formosan languages). After the research, the household registration records remarks of "mountains/plains indigenous peoples". The governmental statistics also listed 9 recognized subgroups under mountains indigenous peoples. However, after World War II, the government refused to recognize the plains indigenous peoples.

The following is a list of classifications through Japanese and post World War II. Note that the Japanese names in parentheses does not exist in pre-World War II Japanese demographic research.

Mountains indigenous peoples 
The Taiwanese government officially recognises 16 ethnic groups of mountains indigenous peoples.

Kavalan and Thao are disputed to be part of mountains or plains indigenous peoples.

Plains indigenous peoples 
Cultures of the plains indigenous peoples have undergone heavy Sinicization. This increases the difficulty in identifying ethnic groups.

References 
 臺灣原住民高山族群百年分類史系列地圖
 臺灣原住民平埔族群百年分類史系列地圖

See also 
 Taiwanese people
 Taiwanese indigenous peoples
 Demographics of Taiwan
 Culture of Taiwan
 Languages of Taiwan
 Formosan languages

Ethnic groups
Taiwan